The Silence of Murder is a mystery novel for teen readers written by American author Dandi Daley Mackall and published by Knopf Doubleday Publishing Group (now owned by Penguin Random House) on 11 October 2011. The book won the Edgar Award for Best Young Adult in 2012.

The story centers on the murder of John Johnson, a beloved small-town high school teacher and baseball coach. The only suspect is Jeremy Long, a student at the school who has been voluntarily mute for almost a decade. Jeremy's younger sister Hope believes her brother is not responsible for the crime, and sets out to prove his innocence and find the true killer.

References 

Edgar Award-winning works
American young adult novels
American crime novels
2011 American novels
Alfred A. Knopf books